A service data point is the node in the IN GSM which is responsible for providing subscriber information. A GSM network element that needs information about subscriber will interrogate the SDP about such information.

The operator has to define all the rate plans in SDP. The SDP is being interrogated on a periodical interval to evaluate the validity of the current call by the subscriber. The validity is being measured according to several criteria:
The subscriber balance cover the charge of the service being requested by him/her.
The subscriber is eligible to use the service according to his rate plan.

Network architecture